Summer Lovers is a 1982 American romantic comedy film written and directed by Randal Kleiser and starring Peter Gallagher, Daryl Hannah and Valerie Quennessen. It was filmed on location on the island of Santorini, Greece. The original music score is composed by Basil Poledouris. Summer Lovers featured "Hard to Say I'm Sorry", a No. 1 hit for Chicago, and "I'm So Excited" by The Pointer Sisters.

Plot
Americans Michael Pappas and Cathy Featherstone, a young couple from Connecticut who have just graduated from college, have known each other about 10 years and have been together about half that time. They vacation for almost the entire summer on the Greek island of Santorini. Michael sees it as a chance to enjoy one last crazy summer before going to work at his recently deceased father's business in the fall. When they visit a nude beach crowded with other young tourists, they are hesitant at first but find themselves getting caught up in the uninhibited energy that surrounds them.

Cathy reads a book of sexual techniques, then ties Michael to the bed and drips candle wax on his chest. She comments that everyone thinks she's "such a Goody Two-Shoes" but she wants a little more adventure and is yearning to rebel against her rather conservative Old money upbringing.

Michael, who says he has never been with another woman, keeps noticing Lina Broussard, a French archaeologist on temporary assignment at the nearby Akrotiri excavation. One day, at the beach without Cathy, he gets his chance to talk to Lina and ends up starting an affair with her. He then feels so guilty that Cathy immediately notices something is wrong, and he admits what he has done, insisting that he still loves Cathy.

Cathy is naturally disturbed by this, but tells him to get it out of his system, which he takes as permission to return to Lina. Cathy then goes to a local bar intending to sleep with another man as a way to get revenge against Michael for cheating on her. But in the end she chickens out after getting picked up by an amorous local boy. When Michael comes home later after seeing Lina again, Cathy is angry.

Cathy goes to Lina's home to confront her. Lina assures Cathy that she does not intend to take Michael away from her, which seems to calm Cathy somewhat. Lina and Cathy end up spending several hours together getting acquainted, and find themselves fascinated by each other's work—Lina's archeology and Cathy's photography.

Michael is confused when he learns that the two women are developing a friendship, but he quickly recovers and the three of them spend a few days gradually getting closer. Cathy knows Michael is still sleeping with Lina from time to time, but seems to accept it, although she says it would be difficult for her to see them in bed together. Nevertheless, she tolerates increasing signs of affection between Michael and Lina in her presence.

In a very tense scene one evening, Cathy encourages Michael to kiss Lina. He gives Lina a light peck, but Cathy says it isn't convincing. He gradually turns up the heat while watching Cathy intently for her reaction. He then kisses Cathy, checking to see how this makes Lina feel. The three end up spending the night together. Lina moves in with them, and they continue enjoying the island paradise as a threesome.

Just as the fantasy seems to be a total success, the natural complications of domestic life, like who does the laundry or dishes, come to the foreground. The three work through these problems, but then Cathy's mother, Jean, appears on a surprise visit, snapping everyone back to reality. The visit is particularly tense because Cathy's mother arrives to awaken Michael and Lina after a birthday party for Lina at which the three cover each other in olive oil. Cathy tells Jean she's never been happier in her life. Although Lina claims to be bad at relationships and prefers just "screwing", the three actually seem to be falling in love all around.

Finding herself in an intense relationship, and uncertain about her future with them, Lina begins to fear getting hurt when the summer ends and the Americans return home. They tell her it doesn't have to end, but don't go into any details. To avoid getting too close to her new friends, Lina disappears with another young man, Jan Tolin, she met at the beach.

Cathy and Michael are distraught, and spend several days searching for Lina. Eventually they conclude they won't find her as long as she wants to remain hidden. But their memories of Lina loom over everything they try to do, and they can no longer enjoy their time on the island. They pack up to return home, even though they have three weeks remaining prepaid on their rental.

Lina finds her fears are outweighed by her feelings for the Americans, and returns to reunite with them, only to discover they have already gone. She races to the airport and intercepts them just as they are about to board the aircraft. Overjoyed at seeing her again, Cathy and Michael return to spend the last three weeks of their summer with her.

Cast

 Peter Gallagher as Michael Pappas
 Daryl Hannah as Cathy Featherstone
 Valérie Quennessen as Lina Broussard (listed as Valerie Quennessen)
 Barbara Rush as Jean Featherstone
 Carole Cook as Barbara Foster
 Hans van Tongeren as Jan Tolin
 Lydia Lenosi as Aspa 
 Vladimiros Kiriakidis as Yorghos
 Carlos Rodriguez Ramos as Cosmo 
 Henri Behar as Phillippe
 Janie Benjamin as Trish Saunders
 Rika Dialina as Monica
 Andreas Filipidis as Andreas
 Hilary Shepard as Camp Fire Girl

Production
Summer Lovers with the screenplay by director Randal Kleiser was filmed during August–October 1981 primarily on the Greek island of Santorini. Other scenes were filmed on the islands of Crete, Delos and Mykonos. The villa that the Michael and Cathy characters stayed at was purchased by a couple in 1987 and made into a gift shop named "Summer Lovers".

The production secured an unprecedented permission to film at an actual dig, the presumed "lost city of Atlantis" at Akrotiri. In an area of the site selected for its light and production values, Quennessen, under the supervision and instructed by a real archaeologist, began work before the cameras, she had hardly set to work when she uncovered several pieces of 3,500-year-old pottery which were turned in and added to the scientific collection.

The film was shot flat (1.85:1), but all home video editions are in 1.33:1 (4:3) pan & scan ratio. Summer Lovers is erroneously listed as a scope (2.35:1) production in Leonard Maltin's movie guide, as well as the IMDb. In fact, the film's original press kit confirms that the film was shot in the 1.85:1 aspect ratio. Occasionally on the MGM HD network, the film is shown in 1:85.1 aspect ratio (16:9) in 1080i high definition. The film was available on Blu-ray on August 11, 2015 (limited edition to 3000). There are scenes in the film's trailer that do not appear in the final cut. German TV has shown a wider screen version than the DVD/Blu-ray releases, but with reduced vertical picture.

Hans Van Tongeren, an acclaimed Dutch actor, was visiting the area as a tourist when Daryl Hannah spotted him in the crowd. She arranged a meeting with the director and, subsequently, Van Tongeren was added to the cast as Jan. In a scene, actor Christopher Atkins was in a photograph published in a Greek magazine. Atkins had recently starred in The Blue Lagoon  (1980) for  director Randal Kleiser. Daryl Hannah's character remarks, "I use to dream I was a mermaid." Two years later, Daryl Hannah starred as a mermaid in Splash (1984).

Summer Lovers is the final theatrically-released film of actress Valérie Quennessen, who played a working archaeologist. She retired from acting shortly after to raise her children and died in a car accident in 1989 at the age of 31. It was also the last movie released by Filmways as it was already a new acquisition for Orion Pictures; on August 31, 1982, it was renamed with its parent's name, marking the end of Filmways name.

Soundtrack
 Side 1
 "Summer Lovers" – Performed by: Michael Sembello.
 "Your Love" – Performed by: LIME.
 "Just Can't Get Enough" – Performed by: Depeche Mode.
 "If Love Takes You Away" – Performed by: Stephen Bishop.
 "On Any Night" – Performed by: Rosalie Winker Karalekas.
 "Johnny and Mary" – Performed by: Tina Turner.
 "Sea Cave (Instrumental)" – Performed by: Basil Poledouris
 "Love & Emotion" – Performed by: Mink DeVille

 Side 2
 "Do What Ya Wanna Do" – Performed by: Nona Hendryx
 "Play to Win" – Performed by: Heaven 17
 From the album Penthouse & Pavement (1981)
 "Take Me Down to the Ocean" – Performed by: Elton John
 "Crazy in the Night" – Performed by: Tina Turner.
 "Sexy Dancer" – Performed by: Prince
 From the album Prince (1979)
 "Hard to Say I'm Sorry" – Performed by: Chicago.
 From the album Chicago 16 (1982)
 "Get Away" – Performed by: Chicago.
 "Search for Lina (Instrumental)" – Performed by: Basil Poledouris
 "Play" – Performed by: Heaven 17
 "Amoureux Fou De Toi" – Performed by: Plastic Bertrand
 "I'm So Excited" – Performed by: The Pointer Sisters

Charts

Reception
Summer Lovers was poorly received by critics. The film holds a rating of 22% on Rotten Tomatoes based on nine reviews, with an average rating of 4.5/10.

Roger Ebert reviewed the film with two of four stars and noted that the film's central core was as a "beach film" but that the director's vision was confusing. "His problem, then, is that his insights keep interrupting the sex, and the sex keeps undermining the insights. The result is a movie that doesn't really work as semi-erotic romance, and never quite gets itself together as a character study." According to Ebert, it is "sort of fun, in a silly way", for which the engaging lead actors have to receive much the credit.

When asked by David Letterman to give a recent example of bad taste, director John Waters said he loved the film because it was "about being young, rich, stupid and nude."

In 2015, Jim Hemphill wrote that "under Kleiser’s relaxed but precise direction, their romantic adventures are incredibly erotic without ever coming across as “dirty” or smarmy. Indeed, one of the most appealing aspects of Summer Lovers is the innocence both its protagonists and the film itself project – arriving between the sexual revolution and AIDS, the film has a wistful, lighthearted quality that would have been unthinkable a few years earlier or later. Gloriously photographed in a palette of tan skin against white sand and blue water (...)".

References

External links
 
 
 
 
 Official movie trailer

1982 films
1982 romantic comedy films
1982 independent films
American romantic comedy films
Bisexuality-related films
Films scored by Basil Poledouris
Films about vacationing
Films directed by Randal Kleiser
Films set in Greece
Films set on islands
Films shot in Santorini
Films shot in Crete
Films about threesomes
Filmways films
1980s English-language films
1980s American films